Shropshire is an English ceremonial county. 

Shropshire may also refer to:

People
Adonis Shropshire, American producer
Courtney Shropshire (1877–1965), American philanthropist
Darrell Shropshire (born 1983), American football player
Elmo Shropshire (born 1936), American singer
Mike Shropshire (born 1942), American sportswriter
Terilyn A. Shropshire, American movie and television editor

Other
Shropshire (Detached), a historical enclave of Shropshire in present-day Black Country and environs
Shropshire (district), a unitary authority, the area covered by Shropshire Council
Shropshire sheep, a breed of sheep from the county
Shropshire Blue, a cheese
Shropshire Slasher, a cartoon figure in the 1956 Looney Tunes cartoon Deduce, You Say!
HMS Shropshire, a 1929 British warship
Shropshire (UK Parliament constituency), historic constituency